The second American Basketball Association All-Star Game was played on January 28, 1969, at Louisville Convention Center in Louisville, Kentucky before an audience at 5,407, between teams from the Western Conference and the Eastern Conference. The West team won the game, with a score of 133–127.

Team members and officials
Gene Rhodes of the Kentucky Colonels coached the East, while Alex Hannum of the Oakland Oaks coached the victorious West.  In the previous year, Hannum had coached the NBA's West team to victory in the 1968 NBA All-Star Game.

John Beasley of the Dallas Chaparrals was named MVP of the game, with a 19 points and 14 rebound performance.

The officials were Andy Hershock and Ron Rakel.

Western Conference

Eastern Conference

Progress of the game
The scoring was close, with each team winning two quarters. West was leading by 64–60 at halftime, and by 101–90 at the end of the third quarter.

References

External links
 ABA All Star Game at RemembertheABA.com

All-Star
Basketball competitions in Louisville, Kentucky
ABA All-Star Game
ABA All-star game